MGCP may refer to:
 Glutamate carboxypeptidase II, an enzyme
 Media Gateway Control Protocol, an implementation of the Media Gateway Control Protocol architecture